Bradley Fold railway station served Bradley Fold on the now closed line between Bury and Bolton. The route was lost to a housing development at Bradley Fold in 1994.

References

http://www.heywoodadvertiser.co.uk/news/s/390183_rail_decision_spells_gloom_for_lines_future

Disused railway stations in the Metropolitan Borough of Bury
Former Lancashire and Yorkshire Railway stations
Railway stations in Great Britain opened in 1848
Railway stations in Great Britain closed in 1970